Rain: A Tribute to the Beatles, styled RAIN, is a Beatles tribute and later a theatrical production. Rain gives audiences the experience of seeing Beatles' songs performed live that were never done so by the band itself. It predates the popular Broadway show Beatlemania by several years. Rain has played Broadway, and toured for years.

The show takes the form of a roughly chronological history of The Beatles via their music. About 30 songs are performed during the show. Other than some onstage banter, there is very little dialogue during the production, which consists mostly of exact re-enactments of the Beatles' music. The multimedia production uses high-definition backdrops that feature psychedelic effects, vintage television commercials, and video footage of Rain cast members recreating iconic Beatle moments. For legal reasons, Rain never calls its performers the names of the actual members of The Beatles.

Each production of Rain features two performers for each member of the Beatles, who alternate shows; plus an off-stage keyboardist to replicate the studio sounds familiar from later Beatles records.

History 
Rain began in 1975 as Reign, a Laguna Beach, California, band that played both original music and Beatles covers. Founding members were Mark Lewis, Eddie Lineberry, Bill Connearney, Grant Belotti, Chuck Coffey, and Steve Wight. (Connearney, Belotti, Lineberry, and Alan Hawley had been members of a prior band known as Lucky Dogs.) The name of the band, "Reign/Rain," is a reference to the 1966 Beatles single "Rain," the B-side of "Paperback Writer."

Co-founder and keyboardist Mark Lewis managed the band, became its lead arranger, and found Rain a regular weekly gig doing Beatles covers at the Mine Shaft in Calabasas, California. Before long Rain had a following of Beatles fans around the Los Angeles/Orange County area, and soon extended up the West Coast as far as Seattle.

As the band developed a reputation, they performed at the 1978 Jerry Lewis MDA Labor Day Telethon. In 1979, producer Dick Clark hired Rain members to record exact Beatles covers for the Richard Marquand film Birth of the Beatles.

By 1980, Lewis had built the band into a long-standing touring tradition. The lineup of Rain remained constant until 1980, with Lineberry playing John Lennon, Coffey playing Paul McCartney, Connearney playing George Harrison, and Belotti playing Ringo Starr (with Lewis playing keyboards behind the scenes). Joey Curatolo joined Rain in 1978, sharing the role of Paul with Coffey; Curatolo is still a current member of Rain.

Lineberry left Rain in 1980, and Coffey, Connearney, and Belotti all left in 1982. Joe Bithorn joined the group as "George" in 1983, and is still with Rain. Ralph Castell joined Rain in 1986 as Ringo, and is still with the show.

In 2001 the Rain Corporation took over management of the band. In 2005, management met with producer Jeff Parry to expand the tribute band's scope — which at that point was mostly doing concerts at casinos — and develop a Broadway-style production in the manner of 1977's Beatlemania. The result of this planning eventually became the 2010 Broadway run.

In 2008, Pollstar listed Rain at number 17 in its yearly "Pollstar's Hot Top 20" for overall tickets sales of a touring show, band, or production.

Rain played Hollywood's Pantages Theatre in 2009. In 2010 the production performed at Kansas City's Starlight Theatre and New Orleans' Mahalia Jackson Theater of the Performing Arts.

In 2009, on the eve of Rain moving to Broadway, the Rain Corporation and Parry's Annerin Productions agreed to produce a West End theatre version of the show, with both sides splitting the profits 50-50.

Rain ran on Broadway for 300 shows (and 8 preview performances), first at the Neil Simon Theatre on October 26, 2010 – January 15, 2011, then at the Brooks Atkinson Theatre on February 8, 2011 – July 31, 2011.

In 2012, Parry/Annerin Productions put on Let It Be, a Beatles "concert experience" that played in London's West End. In 2013, on the eve of Let It Be coming to Broadway, the Rain Corporation filed a copyright suit against Parry and his fellow Let It Be producers. Rain claimed that Let It Be was essentially the same concept as Rain, with similar artwork, costumes, and virtually the same song repertoire, and that Rain was entitled to 50% of Let It Be'''s profits." Parry and Annerin instead proposed giving Rain Corporation 7.5% of their profits. The case was settled out of court.

 Synopsis 
The show begins with the four actors portraying an early version of The Beatles' appearance at the Cavern Club in 1962. When this scene closes, The Beatles journey to America, beginning their tour at The Ed Sullivan Show. Moving forward, The Beatles' directions are changing musically while their band grows in popularity performing their largest concert at New York City's Shea Stadium. Subsequent scenes use hallucinogenic and psychedelic designs to represent The Beatles' ever increasing experimentation with substances and Eastern philosophies. The show culminates with the breakup of the group and the end of the 1960s.

 Cast members 

 "John Lennon" 
 Eddie Lineberry (1974–1980) — performed on Birth of the Beatles Randy Clark (1980-1981) - from "Beatlemania"
 Jim Riddle (1983–died 1997) — also performed with Beatlemania Steve Landes (1998–present) —originally from Philadelphia; joined Beatlemania at age 17
 Jimmy Irizarry (c. 2012)
 David Leon (c. 2009)
 Tim Piper (c. 2009)

 "Paul McCartney" 
 Chuck Coffey (1974–1980) — performed on Birth of the Beatles . Chuck passed away in July, 2021, in Georgia.
 Glenn Burtnik (1980-1982)
 Joey Curatolo (1978–present) – originally from Brooklyn; toured with the Broadway production of Beatlemania; father of Paul Curatolo
 Robert "Mac" Ruffing — also played with 1964 the Tribute and Beatlemania Graham Alexander (2010–2011) — originally from New Jersey; member of the 2010 Broadway production
 Alan LaBoeuf (c. 2009)
 Paul Curatolo (2014–present) — originally from Reno; son of Joey Curatolo (who also played Paul); member of the pop band Wayward; plays the bass left-handed like McCartney
 Ian B. Garcia — native of Viña del Mar, Chile

 "George Harrison" 
 Bill Connearney (1974–1982) — performed on Birth of the Beatles; now deceased
 Joe Bithorn (1983–present) — originally from New York; toured with Beatlemania Tom Teeley— also played with Beatlemania and Classical Mystery Tour
 Alastar McNeil — native of Oahu, Hawaii; member of the band Kupa'aina. His grand aunt was Broadway chorus dancer Ruth Sato.
 Jimmy Pou — originally from Miami; was a member of Beatlemania and also portrayed George Harrison in 1964 – The Tribute.
 John Korba

 "Ringo Starr" 
 Grant Belotti (1974–1982) — now deceased
 Bobby Taylor (1980-1985) from "Beatlemania"
 Steve Wight (1979) — performed on Birth of the Beatles Ralph Castelli (1986–present) — originally from Southern California; toured with Beatlemania; played Ringo in Beatlemania: The Movie''
 Aaron Chiazza — former member of Paul Curatolo's band Wayward
 Douglas Cox — originally from Missouri and Texas
 Joe Bologna (c. 2009)
 Chris McBurney

Keyboards / percussion 
 Mark Lewis (1975 – present) — founding member and musical arranger of Rain; retired from performing in 2010 to concentrate on managing the show
 Mark Beyer
 Chris Smallwood – originally from Kentucky

References

External links
 
  RAIN: A Tribute to the Beatles Facebook page  
 "Original Rain" Facebook page

Musicals based on songs by the Beatles
The Beatles tribute bands
Revues
Musicals inspired by real-life events
Drama Desk Award winners
1975 musicals